Myopites hemixanthus is a species of tephritid or fruit flies in the genus Myopites of the family Tephritidae.

Distribution
South Africa.

References

Tephritinae
Myopites
Insects described in 1931
Diptera of Africa